Philippine Wrestling Revolution (PWR) was an independent professional wrestling promotion based in the Philippines.  PWR was founded in December 2013, and closed in September 14, 2022.

History
Professional wrestling in the Philippines started in 1989 through the short-lived show called "Pinoy Wrestling". It aired on national television via PTV-4, with character actor Johnny Revilla as host and ringside reporter comedian Jimmy Fabregas. Its roster consisted of locally trained wrestlers such as Joe Pogi, King Cobra, Macho Franco, Caloy Bakal, and Max Buwaya. There were also tag teams such as The Smoky Mountain Brothers, The Bakal Boys, and Dr. Q's henchmen The Brusko Brothers, Kamikaze Kid and Roboto. Women wrestlers like Aerobica and Pinay Wonder and midgets such as The Mikrobyos and The Tureritos were also featured. Other wrestlers include Juan Duwag, Waway The Wild Man, Turko Turero, Pinoy Ranger, Sultan Bato, Iggy Igorot, Lawin and Zorro. The show was discontinued in the early part of 1990.

In 2012, the idea of forming PWR was born in a Facebook group. Wrestling fans from different parts of the country linked up and were added to the group to establish a wrestling company, discuss fantasy bookings, and conceptualize characters and gimmicks. This came about despite pro wrestling not being as popular in the Philippines since the end of the WWF Attitude Era in the late 1990s and early 2000s as well as the exposure of kayfabe. The upstart promotion got an assist from veteran American pro wrestler Joe E. Legend, who helped them in the preparations.

Sometime between late 2013 and early 2014, the group was contacted by a Japanese promoter Ankei Tamashiro doing a show in the Philippines for WNC-Reina, where two of the main attractions were former WWE and ECW superstar Tajiri and half-Filipina triple crown champion Shuri Kondo. The Japanese promoter's representative in Manila found PWR's Facebook page and asked the group to assist them in setting up and promoting the show in the country. These events further encouraged the group to pursue the idea of setting up the first-ever wrestling promotion in the country.

The pioneer batch of aspiring professional wrestlers were officially trained by an American pro wrestler Josh Bauserman, whom they met in Manila during the early stages of planning. The founders credit Bauserman for teaching them everything about pro wrestling, from in-ring maneuvers to backstage activities.

In recent years, PWR has expanded its reach, with international wrestlers such as Billy Suede and Koto Hiro performing for circuit while its own roster of wrestlers participates in inter-promotional matches abroad.

In 2017, WWE officials were in attendance during PWR Live: Bagong Yugto solidifying PWR's presence in the international community.

Impact of the COVID-19 pandemic 
Like many sports promotions affected by the COVID-19 pandemic, PWR cancelled their planned live events for the rest of 2020, for the safety of their performers, staff, and crew, as well as that of the "Revo-Nation" (PWR's nickname for its fans and audience). As of March 2021, it has yet to hold a live event due to ongoing restrictions on public gatherings in the Philippines to prevent the spread of COVID-19.

On March 12, 2020, PWR announced that the Path of Gold event, originally scheduled for March 22, will not push through. Their performance at the intermission of that year's Rakrakan Festival (which was itself rescheduled to April, from February, and later cancelled) eventually did not take place as well. PWR's flagship event Wrevolution X was likewise cancelled. PWR President Red Ollero, in an episode of the promotion's "Wrestle From Home" Facebook show, said that Wrevolution X was supposed to be held on May 31, 2020.

In a separate interview in an episode of the Wrestling-Wrestling Podcast, Ollero said that he had considered holding shows without a crowd in an undisclosed location, but that hasn't really come to fruition yet due to the country's quarantine protocols.

PWR also originally planned in 2020 a sequel to the PWR Special: Homecoming event. Ollero revealed in the October 5 pilot episode of PWR's Philippine Wrestling Podcast that "Homecoming 2" was supposed to happen at the SM SkyDome.

While it wasn't able to hold live events yet, PWR sought to continue connecting with their fans online through the "Wrestle From Home" Facebook show from March to June 2020 and the Philippine Wrestling Podcast from October to December 2020. PWR also made available the PWR Special: Homecoming (2019) event for streaming through the virtual events space Stream from May 31 to July 31, 2020.

Events
The promotion held its inaugural event called Renaissance on September 27, 2014, at the Makati Cinema Square Arena, Makati.

PWR then held subsequent events to complete its calendar: Terminus, Vendetta, Path of Gold, and Wrevolution X, which is considered to be PWR's WrestleMania equivalent.

On August 15, 2015, PWR held an event called PWR Live, still at the Makati Cinema Square Arena. Multiple events named PWR Live have been staged since.

To date, 2 PWR shows have been aired on television (on tape delay) via TV5: Terminus (2014) and PWR Live (August 2015)

On February 5, 2016, PWR held a house show at the LBD Sports Arena in Candelaria, Quezon, its first outside Metro Manila.

List of events

2014

2015

2016

2017

2018

2019

2020

Championships and accomplishments

PWR Championship 
In May 2017, the PWR Championship was established to be called as "Kampeon ng Pilipinas"

Combined reigns

Philippine Excellence (PHX) Championship 
The title had been known as the Philippine Hybrid X Championship until June 2018.

Combined reigns

PWR Tag Team Championship

Combined reigns

All Out War Championship 
All defenses of the All Out War Championship are done under All Out War Match rules. Similar to the WWE Hardcore Championship.

Combined reigns

Path of Gold

Roster

Male wrestlers

Female wrestlers

Other personnel

Alumni

 Barry Navarro
"Beautiful" Billy Suede
 Blackzilla
 "Big Bank” Bruno Bernardo
 ”Classical” Bryan Leo
 Chris Panzer
 The Council of Trabajadores (Uno, Dos, Tres, Maximo & Supremo)
 Dan Ericson
 Draven Sloane
 Epitaph
 "Mr. Philippine Wrestling" Jake De Leon
 John Sebastian
 Kanto Terror
 Keivan Skull
 Ken Warren
 Lucas Hunter
 Main Maxx
 Mayhem Brannigan
 Mark D. Manalo
 McKata
 Miguel Rosales
 Mike Shannon
 Mike Vargas
 Mr. Sy
 Mr. William Melvin
 "The Machine" Mavericc Knight
 THE Nelson Borman Jr.
 Peter Versoza
 Robin Sane
 Samoan Papa
 SANDATA
 Scarlett

Visiting international wrestlers

PWR Boot Camp
The promotion has posted various campaigns on most social media platforms for pro-wrestling training on both males and females ages 18 and above for their scheduled boot camp.

References

External links
 
 PWR Google Plus
 The Smark Gilas-Pilipinas Podcast

Professional wrestling promotions
Organizations established in 2013
Professional wrestling in the Philippines